The Permanent Representative of Syria to the United Nations is Syria's foremost diplomatic representative at the United Nations.

List of heads of mission
The Permanent Representatives were the following:
1946–1948: Fares al-Khoury
1951–1953: Farid Zeineddine
1953–1957: Rafik Asha
1962–1964: Salah el-Dine Tarazi
1965–1972: George Tomeh
1972–1975: Haissam Kelani
1975–1978: Mowaffak Allaf
1978–1979: Hammud al-Shufi
1981–1986: Dia Allah El-Fattal
1988–1990: Ahmad Fathi Al-Masri
1996–2003: Mikhail Wehbe
2003–2006: Faisal Mekdad
2006–2020: Bashar Jaafari
2020–present: Bassam al-Sabbagh

References

United Nations
Syria